Whirily is a place and locality in the local government area of the Shire of Buloke, Victoria, Australia. Whirily post office opened on 1 October 1912 and was closed on 1 October 1913.

References

Shire of Buloke